Black swan is the common name for Cygnus atratus, an Australasian waterfowl.

(The) Black Swan(s) may also refer to:

Film and television
The Black Swan (film), a 1942 swashbuckler film
Black Swans (film), a 2005 Dutch drama film
Black Swan (film), a 2010 film starring Natalie Portman
"Black Swan", an episode of FlashForward
"The Black Swan", an episode of Curb Your Enthusiasm

Literature
Black Swan (imprint), an imprint of Transworld Publishers, UK
The Black Swan (Lackey novel), a fantasy novel by Mercedes Lackey
The Black Swan (Mann novel), a short book by Thomas Mann
The Black Swan (Sabatini novel), a 1932 pirate adventure novel by Rafael Sabatini
The Black Swan: The Impact of the Highly Improbable, a 2007 book about uncertainty by Nassim Nicholas Taleb
Black Swan (comics), a German Marvel Comics mercenary and enemy to Deadpool and Agent X
"The Black Swan", a 1994 work of short fiction by Grace Andreacchi
"Black Swans", a 1997 essay by Lauren Slater

Music

Artists
Elizabeth Greenfield (1809–1876), or The Black Swan, an American singer 
The Black Swans, an American indie rock band
Blackswan, a South Korean girl group

Albums
Black Swan (album), an album by Athlete
blkswn, an album by Smino, or its title track
The Black Swan (Bert Jansch album)
The Black Swan (Story of the Year album), or its title track
The Black Swan (The Triffids album)

Songs
"Black Swan", a 2020 song by BTS from Map of the Soul: 7
"Black Swan", a song by Tori Amos from several singles including Past the Mission
"Black Swan", a 2006 song by Belladonna from Metaphysical Attraction
"Black Swan", a 2005 song by Greg Dulli from Amber Headlights
"Black Swan", a 2007 song by Megadeth from some versions of United Abominations
"Black Swan", an aria in Gian Carlo Menotti's opera The Medium
"Black Swan", a 2006 song by Thom Yorke from The Eraser
"Black Swan", a 2020 song by TWRP, from the album Over the Top

Labels
Black Swan Records, a 1920s US record label
Black Swan Records (UK), a 1960s UK record label

Pubs and hotels
The Black Swan, Oldstead, an inn in Oldstead, North Yorkshire, England
The Black Swan, York, a pub in York, England
Black Swan Hotel, Devizes, an inn in Devizes, Wiltshire, England

Ships
 HMS Black Swan (L57), a sloop of the Royal Navy launched in 1939
 Black Swan-class sloop
Black Swan-class sloop-of-war, a proposed British Royal Navy warship class

Stage
Black Swan State Theatre Company, a theatre company of Western Australia
Black Swan Theatre, a performance venue for the Oregon Shakespeare Festival
The Black Swan or Odile, a character in Swan Lake by Peter Tchaikovsky

Other uses
Black Swan (dredge), a bucket dredge used in Perth, Western Australia, 1872–1911
Black Swan (St. Paul's Churchyard), a historical bookseller in London
Black Swans (special forces), a special forces unit in the Army of the Republic of Bosnia and Herzegovina
Black Swan Data, a London-based technology and data science company
 Black Swan Prize for Portraiture, now The Lester Prize, an Australian art prize
Black Swan Project, the code name of a shipwreck recovery project
The Black Swan, a character in the 2000 PC game Crimson Skies

See also 
Black swan emblems and popular culture
Black swan problem, the problem of induction in philosophy
Black swan theory, a term developed by Nassim Taleb to label unexpected, rare events
Faulty generalization, including the black swan fallacy
 Inverted Swan, a stamp featuring a printing error